Bruce Angus Fraser (9 January 1954 – 16 December 2006) was an author that specialized in digital color technology, including hardware and software for creating and managing color images and publications. Bruce was a founding member of PixelGenius, LLC.

Awards 
Bruce received the first National Association of Photoshop Professionals (NAPP) Lifetime Achievement Award in 2006.

Bruce also was inducted in the Photoshop Hall of Fame in 2006.

Publications 
Many of Bruce's books were published by Peachpit Press, and are still in print. http://www.peachpit.com/authors/bio.aspx?a=35c6a590-6afd-4bff-8e11-7b11840dccc5
He was a contributing editor for Macworld magazine and CreativePro.com.

References

External links
 PixelGenius

1954 births
2006 deaths
British technology writers
Writers from Edinburgh